Macropanax concinnus is a species of plant in the family Araliaceae. It is a tree endemic to Java in Indonesia. It is a vulnerable species threatened by habitat loss.

References

concinnus
Endemic flora of Java
Vulnerable plants
Taxonomy articles created by Polbot